Sergey Nikolayevich Blazhko (Сергей Николаевич Блажко in Russian) (November 17, 1870 – February 11, 1956, Moscow) was a Russian and Soviet astronomer, a corresponding member of the Academy of Sciences of the Soviet Union (1929). He was a graduate of Moscow State University and held a number of positions there including head of the Moscow Observatory from 1920-1931. He discovered a secondary variation of the amplitude and period of some RR Lyrae stars and related pulsating variables, now known as the Blazhko effect.

Sergey Blazhko was awarded the Stalin Prize (1952), two Orders of Lenin, two other orders and numerous medals. The crater Blazhko on the Moon is named after him.

References

1870 births
1956 deaths
19th-century astronomers
20th-century Russian astronomers
Corresponding Members of the USSR Academy of Sciences
Academic staff of Moscow State University
Stalin Prize winners
Recipients of the Order of Lenin
Recipients of the Order of the Red Banner of Labour
Astronomers from the Russian Empire
Russian astronomers
Soviet astronomers
Burials at Vagankovo Cemetery